Archer Aviation is an American company commercializing electric vertical takeoff and landing aircraft, headquartered in San Jose, California. Archer's eVTOL aircraft have a range of up to 100 miles and travel at speeds of up to 150 mph.

Its eVTOL aircraft are planned to transport people in and around cities in an air taxi service. United Airlines has also ordered two hundred Archer planes.

Aircraft and air taxi service
Maker, Archer's first demonstrator aircraft, was unveiled on June 10, 2021, at an event in Los Angeles, California. Maker is a two-passenger fully electric vertical takeoff and landing aircraft with 12 electric propellers: six tilt-props (each with five blades) for forward and VTOL flight and six stationary propellers (each propeller with two blades) for VTOL-only flight. Maker is designed to travel at up to 150 mph over 60 miles. The aircraft is powered by six independent battery packs. In November 2021, Archer moved Maker from its headquarters to its flight test facility to start initial test flights. Maker also received its airworthiness certificate from the FAA in December 2021. Archer also completed its first flight in December 2021.

Archer's aerial ridesharing service, also referred to as Urban Air Mobility (UAM), has been pushed back one year to 2025 and is planned to begin operations in Miami, Florida and Los Angeles, California. Archer is working with Urban Movement Labs and the Los Angeles Department of Transportation to help build the necessary infrastructure and service routes. It is also working with the City of Miami on similar plans.

History and Developments
Archer was founded on October 16, 2018, by Brett Adcock and Adam Goldstein to develop electric vertical takeoff and landing aircraft. The company was originally started by Adcock and Goldstein out of pocket. Later, Marc Lore, a Walmart executive, also supported its launch.

Initially, Archer worked on developing aircraft with the Herbert Wertheim College of Engineering at the University of Florida, from which both Adcock and Goldstein graduated. Archer now operates a research lab on the University of Florida's campus in Gainesville, Florida, which was funded by Adcock and Goldstein.

In August 2022, United Airlines paid Archer a $10 million deposit for 100 of their electric flying taxis.

On November 17, 2022 Archer unveiled details of its production vehicle dubbed "Midnight". The aircraft is a piloted, four-passenger air taxi the company said will enter flight testing by the second quarter of 2023 and service by 2025. It is designed to carry passengers on short hops, such as 20-mi. beeline routes between airports and downtown centers.

Archer announced its Maker prototype had achieved full transition from vertical to horizontal flight on November 29, 2022. This milestone was said to be an important validation step for the flight control systems and aircraft architecture that is also applicable to its Midnight production aircraft.

References

External links
 

2018 establishments in California
Aircraft manufacturers of the United States
Companies based in San Jose, California
Electric aircraft
VTOL aircraft